The following is a list of fictional characters featured in the manga and anime series GetBackers.

Protagonists

Ban Midou

 is one of the main protagonists in GetBackers. The "ban" can mean "barbarian" or "uncouth/vulgar". This is the result of the first meeting between Paul and Ban. When der Kaiser first introduced the infant Ban to Paul, Ban kicked Paul in the face while being held by him, causing Paul to insist that the Ban of Yaban suited the child perfectly. der Kaiser agreed.

He is 18 years old in the manga and 21 years old in the anime. He is one quarter German is the grandchild of the "Last Witch of the 20th Century". Ban is a brother-like figure to Himiko Kudo after she came to terms with her brother's death, and later it is revealed in volume 38 of the manga that Ban is actually related to her by blood through the Witch Queen.

In the GetBackers duo, he is the one who thinks of the plans for their moves. Initially, Ginji Amano was seen to be a sidekick to him (in fact, when they first formed their partnership, Ban insisted that Ginji was only his sidekick), but as the story progressed, Ginji gradually held his own in their missions, and Ban acknowledged him as an equal.

Ban is very intelligent, having studied fighting techniques, science, history, music, art and magic from a very young age as a result of being hunted in Europe by shamans during his childhood. More often surprises everyone with his knowledge and abilities, such as being able to play the violin. He also bears a striking resemblance to his father. In fact, in the arcs where his hair is "down" ("Venus de Milo" and "Kiryuudo" arcs), he looks like der Kaiser during his Getbacker days with Paul. Another trait which both father and son share is that while they may appear cold and ruthless on the surface, they are actually very warm and caring towards their friends.

Ban inherited his powers from his grandmother. Ban utilizes two main abilities. It should only be used three times per day and cannot be used on the same person again for the next 24 hours. Furthermore, while the illusion only lasts for one minute, should Ban will it, the one affected by the Jagan can be placed inside a time-warp zone via the illusion created by the technique, meaning that to them, one minute in real life could last up to several hours in the Jagan's influence. It is rare for Ban to use the Evil Eye to defeat his opponents, preferring to use it to aid in the retrieval process or to give clients happy/nightmarish dreams; however, he has been shown to use it in defeating Takuma Fudou's insight during the blank second.

If the user were to use the Jagan a fourth time within a 24-hour period, they would receive a penalty for using it. After the fourth use the user disappears both from the physical world and from the memories of all who know him. With this in mind, Ban requested one final duel with Akabane Kurodou. After an intense struggle, the two manage to strike each other, causing Ban to collapse and Akabane to disappear. However, Akabane had not died, as assumed, but instead, implanted a surgical scalpel into Ban's chest as a "final favor", given to Ban for allowing Akabane to see his own limits. Akabane later explained that because having Ban disappear would be a pity, he attempted to fool the "Archive" by faking Ban's death and delaying Ban's disappearance from using his fourth Jagan just long enough for Ginji to reach Babylon City and resolve everything, thus saving Ban from disappearing.

His second ability is the Snakebite. Because he is a direct descendant of the Witch clan, and was born under the star of Asclepius, he possesses incredible superhuman strength, which gives him a gripping force of 200 kilograms in each hand. It is also shown that he is strong enough to break open the doors of an armored steel truck and punch hard enough to create large craters in the ground or break walls, occasionally even collapsing multistory buildings. Ban can augment the strength of his Snakebite by reciting a certain chant in order to draw power from Asclepius, with the resulting force being sufficient enough to devastate even the most formidable of opponents with just a single blow. The full extent of the Asclepius curse upon Ban is expressed through his entire right arm degenerating into a grotesque state not unlike a demon's limb, granting Ban even greater power but at the risk of losing himself to his savage instincts. Later Ban manages to transcend the Asclepius curse and draw out his full potential on his own, which is reflected by the manifestation of a single angel wing behind his right shoulder.

In the "Get Back the Lost Time" arc, his skills grow by leaps and bounds due to his learning abilities. Against Natsuhiko, he manages to execute a new move, "Snake Kill", using his left hand.

Anime News Network praised the style of the Jagan in the manga to be a "horrifying nightmare". The Tokyo Pop translation of the Ban Midou dialogues has been criticized for making him sound like a gangster.

Ginji Amano

 is the "G" in the GetBackers. He is 18 years old in the manga. Ginji was formerly the leader of a gang called "The VOLTS" in the Limitless Fortress, the fearsome .

He received the title Lightning Emperor because of his ability to control electricity. This control grants him several unique abilities such as amazing regenerative power and the ability to become a human magnet and battery. Despite Ginji's dark past, his demeanor is one of an unassuming, energetic, and friendly boy with a strong sense of justice. He makes friends easily, often without trying and is trusting and open to an almost naive extent. However, when exposed to remnants of his past, he has a tendency to revert to his darker "Lightning Emperor" persona. For comical purposes, he also turns droopy and super deformed, most likely designed after a Tarepanda. He's frequently beaten up by Ban for doing stupid things. As a child, his guardian was Takeru Teshimine, then ruler of the Limitless Fortress. Ginji founded the "VOLTS", a gang led by The Lightning Emperor, and "The Four Kings of the VOLTS" to protect the Infinity Fortress from the monsters of the Beltline. During the era of the VOLTS, only one man (Midou Ban) is known to have defeated the Lightning Emperor, though not in a fight of physical strength. All Ban did was show him that he was causing pain to many. While they were fighting, Lightning Emperor summoned lightning which resulted in a huge blast. Though Ban escaped from the blast, he was able to see the infinite energy flowing in the Lightning Emperor, which made it impossible to beat him. Then, Ban remembered that the Lightning Emperor only appeared after Ban attacked one of his friends. He then showed him that though the Lightning Emperor said that he would protect everyone, he himself killed many since many were caught up in the blast. After seeing the devastation, he caused, the Lightning Emperor shrieked and expelled all the power within him, turning back into Ginji. Ban noticed that he has changed and did not deliver the killing blow to Ginji as he sat in front of him, his head bowed and crying.

Little is known of his past until the last volume of the manga where it is revealed that his mother, who Teshimine told Ginji was waiting for him in Babylon City, had created the world in which the GetBackers live. Her reason for doing this was that in the real world (Babylon City), Ginji had died as a child. Unbearably sad, she considered cloning him, but realized that it would not be the same child, she created a back-up of the world where he could live and grow.

When transformed into the Lightning Emperor, Ginji glows with a brilliant light and has bolts of electricity flowing around him. Although sharing the same body as that of Ginji, the Lightning Emperor is the polar opposite of the happy-go-lucky Ginji; his features harden, and he becomes merciless towards almost anyone. He first came into being when Ginji was a young boy, as the Beltline Monsters invaded the lower levels of the Limitless Fortress. Ginji and a friend were attempting to escape from the hunters when Ginji's friend was struck by an arrow. The whole invasion force was annihilated in an instant. From that point on, whenever Ginji is confronted with a difficult situation, emotionally or physically, the Lightning Emperor appears to make everything that troubles Ginji disappear. However, this ultimately causes more pain for the peaceful Ginji, as death is the last thing he wants.

In the "Get Back the Lost Time" arc, after the Lightning Emperor was successfully able to defeat the Voodoo King, it is revealed that the Lightning Emperor would never appear again as his reason for existing was over. The Lightning Emperor, who was born from the synchronization of Ginji's rage and Mugenjou's power, existed to defeat the person whose purpose was disrupting the plans of the "Archive" (the Voodoo King). His purpose was to protect the world without judgment from Good or Evil.

The source of the Lightning Emperor's power is the limitless energy currents flowing through the Limitless Fortress, and as such, he draws as much power from them as he needs. Sometimes, though, this can put the Infinity Fortress in a bad situation if the Lightning Emperor calls for more power in a single instant than the tower is capable of producing. For this reason, he is dangerous to the "Brain Trust" in Babylon City who possess the "Archive" (the sum total of human knowledge past, present and future) as he could potentially erase the "Archive" if he blacked out the Limitless Fortress. Another reason why Ginji/the Lightning Emperor is so dangerous inside the Limitless Fortress is because his existence is "random" in the Babylon City Archives. This means his existence was not foretold and therefore his existence inside the Limitless Fortress changes all the prophecies made by the Brain Trust. The reason for this most likely has to do with his mother.

)

Major Allies

Hevn
She hangs out at the Honky Tonk café, and shares a good working relationship with Paul Wan, the owner.

Hevn may know Masaki Kurusu, one of the Four Kings of VOLTs. In book 30, she requests Akabane to transport her to the top of Babylon Tower, after her first request of asking Akabane to transport the GB duo to the same place was turned down. Akabane cited conflicting interests as his reason for turning down the first quest. As Dr. Jackal left her, she wondered about the true nature of the "Lost Time", and hoped to see a man named Masaki at Babylon Tower. As it turned out, Hevn and Masaki were lovers. Although Masaki tried to forget his feelings for Hevn (and tried to kill her as well), in the end, the couple embraced after Masaki's fight with Ginji.

Kazuki Fuuchouin
 is a major supporting character and ally of the GetBackers. Formerly one of the Four Kings of the Volts, known as Kazuki of the Threads, Kazuki is the last master of the Fuuchouin Thread Arts, a fighting style which utilizes koto strings controlled by vibrations in his fingertips. The strings are very sharp and can tear up solid earth, bones, skin, muscles, and sometimes steel based on the vibrations of the finger. The strings also have other uses, such as listening in on distant conversations. The strings are stored in two bells tied to the front right strand of his hair to ease manipulation.

It is later revealed that the enemy clan, the Kokuchouin, destroyed Kazuki's clan. Kazuki is usually an ally of the GetBackers, due to his friendship with Ginji. He and Ban tolerate each other, but are not close. Kazuki is also the most notably feminine character among the males. He also has strong ties to one of their former enemies, namely Juubei, because they had been friends in the past. In the end of the manga reveals that the GB world is an AI simulation with Infinity Tower as its conduit, explaining the superpowers the characters have.

Masaki Kurusu
 is the last member of the Four Kings during the era of VOLTS. His techniques allow him to control light, bypassing any physical defense and inflicting internal damage, thus earning him the title . He is also able to use light to blind his opponents' senses.

In the manga, he's Hevn's former lover and a good friend of the GetBackers duo. He is the one who explains the Brain Trust's Qualia plan for Mugenjou to the GetBackers.

In the anime, he is openly allied with Babylon City. He kidnaps MakubeX on their orders and reveals that he had been spying on Raitei and Volts for Brain Trust while he was one of the Four Kings.

Shido Fuyuki
, first introduced as the Beastmaster, has the ability to control animals, although it should be better stated that he asks them for favors, as he views animals as his friends. Previously one of the VOLTS' Four Kings, after they disbanded, Shido left the Infinity Fortress to make a living outside, like Ginji Amano, the leader of VOLTS and whom Shido respects as a friend. After reconciling with Ginji (whom he felt had betrayed Volts by leaving the Infinity Fortress) during the "Get Back the Sound of Life!" arc, Shido took a cue from the GetBackers and started his own retrieval service — occasionally aided by Emishi. He is generally very independent and cold to others. Even though his powers allow him to control animals, he considers them friends, and tries to protect them as they do him. He eventually ends up living with Madoka Otowa, and he has an ongoing rivalry with Ban Mido.

In VOLTS, Shido was paired with Masaki Kurusu to protect the East Gates of the Infinity Fortress. Because of this, he knows a lot about Masaki and his followers, although it is doubtful that he knows about Masaki's true identity as a vassal for the Voodoo King. In the "Get Back the Lost Time" arc, he remarks that Masaki has changed a lot from what he used to be, 'a man who will protect the weak'.

Both in the manga and anime, his relationship with Madoka has progressed to a stage whereby he would do almost anything to protect her. As a sign of how well a companion Madoka is, Shido even noted that she could talk to animals, a trait not many ordinary humans could achieve. In the manga finale, he was seen carrying Madoka's shopping bag, possibly a homage to the ending of the anime series, where he does the same thing.

As the last survivor of the Fuyuki Clan, his Chimera form is one of the three "keys" to opening the sealed gates of Babylon City, which Ban's grandmother sealed long ago. Even without activating its powers, he was seen to be able to subdue Kazuki Fuuchouin, even as he went berserk as the Cruel Prince. His Shikizoku power is "Awakening": Using this skill, he can release the potential powers which are hidden within that person. He used this to restore Ginji's powers (and turn him into Raitei) in the "Kiryuudo" arc.

Paul Wan
Paul Wan (王波児, Japanese: Wan Pōru, Chinese Pinyin: Wáng Bōér) is the owner of the Honky Tonk café in Shinjuku where the GetBackers meet frequently. Ban and Ginji always have unsettled tabs with him, and he sometimes forces them to work off their debt or refuses to give them food. While he seems to be mostly retired, Paul has a large source of connections and access to hard-to-get information — which only Hevn and a select few others seem to know about. He is sort of a philosophical father-figure in the series. Later in the manga, it is revealed that Paul, along with Ban's father, were the first generation of GetBackers and they had, in their time, ascended to the top of the Limitless Fortress, even entering Babylon City. However, neither can remember their time there as a result of the seal, which the "stigma" eye gained at that time, placed on the memories of that time. In his fight against Shimon Miroku (the Miroku 7's father), he once reverted to his younger self (during his days as a GetBacker), when he was stronger physically. But, alluding to the wise words he has given to others, he realized that his true strength lies in the wisdom he has discovered in himself since the time he set up the Honky Tonk. He turned back to his older self, donned his trademark dark glasses, and proceeded to defeat his opponent. His dark glasses are completely opaque, forcing him to rely on his "Sixth Sense" to detect his opponent's attacks. Paul controls the winds and this ability, along with his great speed, earned him the nickname, "Gale Emperor" (疾風の王).

Paul is the one who gave Ban his name. After being shown the infant by der Kaiser, Paul received a kick while holding the still unnamed child. His friend was unimpressed, saying that as he expected, Paul had no name sense, but agreed to name his child Ban regardless.

In the anime, Paul's background is revealed in episode 42, and is quite different from the manga. Here, he was once part of a trio of thieves.

Antagonists

Brain Trust
The Brain Trust is a secret organization responsible for the creation of the Limitless Fortress. It was formed by the best scientists, engineers, artists, politicians, patrons, and super-natural beings as an experimental site where any infinite number of ideas that could be conceived could be tested.

In the anime, it is revealed that Gensui Radou had been a member of the Brain Trust before discovering their true intent and leaving in disgust. Likewise, Masaki Kurusu is a Brain Trust operative who had been undercover in Lower Town as a member of the VOLTS to observe their actions.

In the manga, various characters were revealed to be members of the Brain Trust, including Ban's grandmother, who was the head of the department which oversaw matters of the occult.

However, the manga provided much more of a twist: The members of Brain Trust, and Brain Trust itself, actually originate from a separate plane of existence. It is not just the Limitless Fortress that is a virtual reality, but all of the world of GetBackers. The world of GetBackers was essentially a "backup copy" that Brain Trust, existing in the "real world", had hoped to create using the "Archive" as a template of the world. It was through Kagami Kyoji's scientific theory, known as the "Mirror Effect", that the world of GetBackers were able to take actual form on a separate plane of existence.

Sarai Kagenuma
(翳沼沙羅衣 Kagenuma Sarai; Voiced by: Hideyuki Tanaka): In the manga, Sarai is a mysterious character. First appearing in book 34, he presents himself to Teshimine, claiming to know all the truths about the Limitless Fortress. He convinces Takeru that he has come to stop the Voodoo King and together, the two men journey towards Babylon City. Dressed like a monk and accompanied by a creature which looks like a snake with wings, Sarai's skills seem almost certain to revolve around magic.

It is later revealed that he's a living seal, existing to contain the Voodoo King. When Kagami combined the two Himikos, the Voodoo King managed to manifest in place of Sarai. However, with the Voodoo King's defeat, Sarai was freed.

Ura-Fuuchouin
The Ura-Fuuchouin are the rival clan who massacred Kazuki's family to gain absolute control of the Fuuchouin String-style school. They wield taboo Black Threads as their weapons and have taken up residence in Limitless Fortress' Upper Levels.

The Ura-Fuuchouin is headed by '', Kazuki's main rival as heir to the Fuuchouin School. He became its leader after the elimination of the Fuuchouin family and the exile of Kazuki to Lower Town. He is in close association — if not an actual member — with the Voodooists and the Brain Trust, allying himself with Masaki and Kagami in the liege of the mysterious Voodoo King. Also, his fighting abilities are said to be incredible, possibly even higher than that of Ban (But this comment by Kazuki was made before Ban's learning journey.). Later, it became known to Kazuki that Yohan was his younger brother.

Saizou's clan was also killed by the Ura-Fuuchouin, thus making his alliances with both Fuuga and the Kokuchouins highly suspect. Later, it's revealed that he was forced to join Yohan as the young scion implanted a "dark cocoon" made of black thread in his heart. After losing to Kazuki and explaining his plight, which includes the revelation that the members of Fuuga are trapped in the cocoon, Saizou tore his heart out, which liberated the captives.

Three Knights/Drei Ritter
The personal bodyguards of der Kaiser, they consist of the Miroku 7's father, brother, and sister. The younger ones were easily defeated by Paul when he reverted to his "Gale Emperor" days. But the "bearded ojisan" (as Ginji calls Shimon, the father) was able to easily defeat Paul, even when he was using the powers available in his prime. Realising that wisdom is more important than strength, Paul returned to his older self, and defeated the man.

Voodoo King
(manga only) (呪術王 / ブードゥーキング)- A mysterious, shrouded figure to whom Yohan, Masaki, Kagami, and the Cursed Knights have been reporting and taking orders from, the Voodoo King is the head of the Voodoo Clan and, presumably, the cast-out former ruler of Babylon City. The Voodoo King's intention is to collect all three "keys": the GetBackers, Himiko, and Shido (more precisely, the Chimera which he possesses). Once all three are in his possession, the 'keys' will be used to re-open the gates of Babylon City sealed by his nemesis, the Witch Queen.
 
The Voodoo King is usually seen playing chess and seems to know the "Archive"'s contents enough to challenge its predictions by introducing new pawns into his plans. The Voodoo King is extremely powerful, with Stigmas in three eyes, one of them in the center of his forehead. He has been shown easily subduing, and later killing, Fuyuki Shido, even in his full Chimera beast form. He just as effortlessly defeats Emishi Haruki, Kakei Sakura, Uryuu Toshiki, Teshimine Takeru, Radou Ren, Haruki Kaoru, Natsuki Amon, and Agi Ryuuhou all at once in a single move when the group attempts to gang up on him.
 
It is revealed in volume 38 that the Voodoo King is the alter-ego of Sarai Kagenuma. However, when Sarai is present, the Voodoo King does not exist, and the opposite is true as well. After being challenged by Raitei, who appeared without Ginji being in great anger or distress, the Voodoo King battles him. However, it is soon revealed that Raitei and the Voodoo King are exact opposites of each other with Raitei the lord of "existence" and the Voodoo King the lord of "nothingness". The Raitei exists to defeat the Voodoo King because the Voodoo King seeks to disrupt how the world should be.

MakubeX
 is the main antagonist of the "Limitless Fortress" arc when the GetBackers are hired to retrieve the mysterious 'IL' from him. It is later discovered that IL is a computer disc containing important data required for producing an atomic bomb. MakubeX was found in a sack as a child. Only his last name, Makube, is known, due to the fact that it was written on the bag. He later came to be known as MakubeX, the 'x' symbolizing an unknown variable, and his "name" is always written in romaji. MakubeX is a genius hacker, capable of manipulating computers to do whatever he pleases. He was originally taught by Gen but swiftly surpassed him in skill. He is 14 years old, and the youngest in all the GetBackers show

He was raised by Gen, whom he calls Grandfather, but left home to join the VOLTS. During the VOLTS' rule of Infinity Fortress, he was one of the "Four Kings", alongside Shido Fuyuki, Fuuchouin Kazuki, and Masaki Kurusu. After Ginji Amano left the fortress, he, as the only one of the Four Kings remaining, took over, instituting a dictatorial rule; he was known at this period as the "young demon king".

MakubeX's second-in-command is Sakura Kakei. In the "IL" arc, his four chief subordinates were Juubei Kakei, Haruki Emishi, Takuma Fudo, and Kyoji Kagami; Fudou vanished afterward, but Juubei and Emishi remained with him. In the manga, after the Divine Design arc, Toshiki Uryuu came under him. He is especially close to Sakura, as shown in the Lost Time arc when he was forced to fight her while she was under the influence of the Black Thread. He is also fond of Haruki Emishi, and treats him like family.

In the manga, MakubeX discovered at a young age that all actions in Infinity Fortress were controlled by the "god" of Babylon City, the top area of the fortress. Realizing this, he decided to give the "god" an edict: turn back time to the time of the rule of Volts, or Infinity Fortress will be destroyed.

It also revealed in the "Lost Time" arc that he has latent special powers. During his losing battle with Sakura, MakubeX was able to manipulate Infinity Fortress' virtual space at will using an "Omega Theorem" without the use of his computer. By then, MakubeX had realized how he was a virtual program, a part of Infinity Fortress itself and knowing this, MakubeX attempted to sacrifice himself to the "Archive" and erase its memory bank and AI from within — much like a computer virus. However, he was stopped by Ban, saying that MakubeX's loss would serve no purpose but to further enrage Ginji into destroying Infinity Fortress and everyone in it.

At the end of the "Lost Time" arc, he gains the ability to leave Infinity Fortress, thus implying that he has become an average teenager, although he seems to have retained all his computing skills. He was last seen bumping into the majority of the cast while shopping with Sakura.

Juubei Kakei 
Juubei is sometimes called  because he fights using long acupuncture needles. His needles have different powers, some even lethal, and he must control them with precision in order for them to be effective. Juubei is protective of his older sister, Sakura, and will come to her defense if she is threatened. Ever since he was a child, he has protected Kazuki, as he believed his clan was destined to guard his family. When VOLTS disbanded and Kazuki left, Juubei offered his support for MakubeX in pursuit of a new Endless City. When Kazuki goes with the GetBackers to stop them, they faced each other in a battle.

The heir to a clan that has served the Fuuchouins as doctors since time immemorial, he and Kazuki Fuuchouin were childhood friends. In the Limitless Fortress, he assumes the second post under Kazuki in the legendary gang. When Kazuki left Limitless Fortress, Juubei remained and they eventually met in battle during the IL retrieval, at which point Juubei lost his eyesight. However, in the aftermath of the battle, they were reconciled and became close again.

He recovers his eyesight in the arc "Get Back the Lost Time". In this arc, he battles with Ginji. The fight reaches a point when Ginji reverts to his old self, the boy Raitei, and proceeds to destroy everything in his path, including Juubei. However, Juubei is saved by Ban and MakubeX, and the former manages to make Ginji return to his former state. Later, he, together with his sister, Sakura Kakei, and his rival-turned-comrade, Toshiki Uryuu (all remnants of Fuuga), present a last stand at the gate to the Beltline, to protect the GetBackers, MakubeX, and Kazuki as they enter the threshold of horrors. After this, Juubei somehow manages to join up with Kazuki as the latter faces off with the Ura-Fuuchouin clan. For a while, his heart is ripped out of its body by Yohan. In the end, he is saved by Kazuki, who manages to end the feud between his younger brother, Yohan, and the rest of his clan.

Haruki Emishi
(笑師春樹 Emishi Haruki; One of the followers of VOLTS in the Limitless Fortress, he was known as the "Fresh Blood Joker" (Senketsu no Joker) because he would always laugh as the blood of his enemies was shed. Also, his skills in combat mean that he is often covered in the blood of his enemies after battles. Emishi's weapon is a long whip woven from the hair of the women of his people, which is also referred to as "Dragon's Hair" because, thanks to the special way the hair is looked after before and after it is woven as well as the special way that it is braided, the whip itself is as strong and pliable as a dragon's whisker. The whip itself consists of a single grip in the middle with two whip lengths protruding from each side, which Emishi handles very well with quick and fluid attacks such as "The Spinning top", "Venom Imitation", "Sandstorm", or "Winds of Destruction". Another technique Emishi has is that his blood, as with all Loulan warriors, is highly combustible when it make contact with oxygen, though, unfortunately for Emishi, it only seems to work when a large, arterial flow of blood is used. He went under the rule of MakubeX after VOLTS broke up as one of the new four kings, chosen for his speed and fighting prowess and fought the retrievers of IL in the Limitless Fortress. He is the only male descendant left from the ancient Western Chinese desert kingdom of Loulan (Rouran) who are able to fight. He is also an admirer and good friend of Shido after the Beastmaster made his way to his village in the Limitless Fortress, delivering food to the starving children, an image radically different from the wandering rumours.

Minor characters

Cursed Knights
The duo of Kaoru Ujiie and Jouya Kanou, they currently serve under their former leader in VOLTS, Masaki Kurusu. The duo have a great fear of the Voodoo King, thus implying that they have doubts about their "new" roles.

Fuuga
(Known as "Elegance", the English translation, in the anime.) A powerful gang in the Lower City of the Limitless Fortress prior to rise of the VOLTS. The group comprised Kazuki Fuuchouin, Toshiki Uryuu, the Kakei siblings (Juubei and Sakura), and Saizou Toufuuin (manga only). It was formed by Saizou and led by Kazuki. Fuuga dispersed when Kazuki joined the VOLTS but was reformed in the "Voodoo Child" arc for the Queen's cup challenge.

Gensui Radou
(螺堂 源水 Radō Gensui; Voiced by: Masaharu Satou): To most people, he is just an old man running a little medicine shop on the fringes of Infinity Fortress with his granddaughter. But behind the frail exterior lies all the secrets of the Limitless Fortress itself. The one who raised MakubeX and taught him all he knows about mathematics and computers, Medicine Man Gen is strongly believed to be the chief architect of the Limitless Fortress and its core tower, Babylon City. Exiled by choice from his creation — which now seems to run on its own AI and virtual reality — Gen seems to be dealing with his guilt for helping create such a monster by assisting those (such as Kazuki and the GetBackers) who wish to unlock Infinity Fortress' secrets and open it up to the world.

Madoka Otowa
(音羽マドカ Otowa Madoka; Voiced by: Yuki Matsuoka): A child prodigy and extremely talented violinist. Although she is blind, she has amazing hearing abilities. She hired the GetBackers for a job once to get back her stolen Stradivarius violin. She has a guide dog named Mozart who also protects her when she's in danger. Eventually, she becomes Shido's girlfriend. She was once kidnapped by Shido's enemies (the Kiryuudo, another fictional ancient clan of aboriginals who communed with insects), who wanted to use her to exchange for the Chimera.
(First Appearances: Manga — Act IV, Part 1, Anime, Episode 6)

She appears twice on the back covers of the Japanese manga volumes, the first being vol.4, where she plays the violin. For vol. 24, she was shown possessed by Kabuto.

Natsumi Mizuki

(水木夏み, Mizuki Natsumi) A 16-year-old high school student, Natsumi was Ban and Ginji's client at the beginning of the anime who then came to work at the Honky Tonk as a part-time waitress. In the anime, she has amazing ping-pong skills and even once takes on a job meant for the GetBackers while they are busy with another case (despite her lack of skill at anything besides table tennis, shogi, and cooking. Notable here is that she chose to wear an outfit consisting of Ban's shirt and glasses, and Ginji's pants and gloves for the case). As the GetBackers' closest friend, Natsumi is very devoted to Ban and Ginji, often worrying about their welfare and staying up late at the Honky Tonk to welcome them back from a mission (this is also seen in the MV of the first ending theme in the anime, although the duo were just away to get groceries on a rainy day. Also, the song is sung by Otoha, Natsumi's voice actor). In a case of real-life mirroring art, in the anime, Natsumi once teamed up with Emishi on a retrieval mission (the same episode where she wore the outfit mentioned above); her voice actress (Otoha) later married a comedian.

In the manga, Natsumi's history and character is markedly different from the anime's. Aside from hints that she and Ginji share an almost flirtatious friendship, her past is introduced in "Birth Arc 2: Get Back the Genius Dog" of vol. 27, as one of the GetBackers' first clients. The daughter of an eminent virus researcher, Natsumi hires them to rescue her "genius" Miniature Dachshund Lucky from performing tricks at a TV station. But Lucky, has more sinister powers and mysteries under his fur and it's up to the GetBackers to get to the bottom of what turns out to be a conspiracy involving superhuman mutants, mad scientists, and Hevn - who also makes her first appearance in the series in this arc (chronologically speaking). Also, she has occasionally displayed maturity beyond her age (probably an influence from Paul). As their "master" battles in Infinity Fortress, Rena worried about his safety. Natsumi, however, was convinced that Paul would be alright, and told her colleague not to worry.

In the drama CDs, all her speaking parts had been removed, and Otoha does not return to voice Natsumi.

(First Appearances — Manga: Act 2, Part 1, Anime: Episode 1)

Ren Radou
(螺堂 レン Radō Ren; Voiced by: Yumiko Nakanishi): Gen Radou's granddaughter. She, too, was adopted by Gen much like MakubeX was, but she has not displayed any special powers. Ren likely does legwork and odd jobs for her grandfather, such as gathering all the pharmaceutical ingredients Gen needs for his medicines and mapping the sections of Infinity Fortress' Lower Town. Despite being of the tomboyish sort, Ren nevertheless has special affection for Kazuki, whom she saved with an elixir after his first encounter with Juubei. Wanting to follow Kazuki out into the outside world after the IL mission, to her horror, Ren discovers she is physically unable to, leading her to question her own existence. In the "Get Back the Lost Time" arc, she guides Shido and Kazuki to the entrance of the Beltline.

Rena Sendo
(manga only) (仙洞レナ Sendō Rena; Voiced by in drama CD: Chiwa Saito): Rena was first seen in the "Divine Design" arc as one of Lucifer's chosen children. As Ramiel, her power was to trap human souls in dolls. She was defeated by Himiko and subsequently became Natsumi's colleague at the Honky Tonk. Previously depressed due to the loss of her father and her sexual abuses under her teacher, Rena perks up under the advice of Paul and tries to be a good helper at the café, though her coffee-making skills, among others, still leave much to be desired. However, since Paul's departure for Infinity Fortress, both she and Natsumi had proved themselves to be capable of handling the sudden surge in business at the café.

Like Natsumi, all references to Rena were removed in the drama CDs, except for her involvement during the "Divine Design" arc. She was referred to as "Ramiel" here.

Sakura Kakei
: Sakura is the older sister of Juubei Kakei, and perhaps MakubeX's most loyal follower. She remained in the Limitless Fortress after the breakup of Volts, where she assisted Makubex to restore order and bring the IL to fruition. Sakura fights using a cloth, which she seems to control via telekinesis. Although she is a skilled fighter, she rarely uses her skills violently, preferring diplomacy to force.

Gangs and Groups

Kiryuudo 7
The Kiryuudo 7 are the seven tribe elders who answer to the leader of the Kiryuudo, Kabuto. They each have a unique specialty.

 is the leader of the Spider clan. Her speciality is "Tactician" and alluding to this, she often works through conceit and disguises. She tricked Ginji twice, disguising herself as a whore and Madoka, respectively. After the GB duo and Himiko raised an uproar in "China Street" (the base of the Spider clan's operations), Jorougumo and her minions retreated to Hell's Valley. There, she suggested that the Kiryuudo 7 be pitted against the GB duo and their allies instead of using the average grunts. However, this scheme backfires when Shido's contacts took down the seven, one after another. After Kabuto's treachery, she lost everyone she cared for (her son Kirihito and lover Onigumo) and surrendered to GB & co. She was later killed, and her soul absorbed by Kabuto. With Kabuto's destruction, she was brought back to life as a normal woman.

 is a monk and leader of the Butterfly clan. He is later revealed to be a traitor and plots the Kiryuudo's fall for the sake of Kabuto's resurrection. His primary powers are illusion, using butterflies through which 'no scent can be smelt, no sound can be heard and nothing can be seen'. He's killed by Ban, who punches him three times (according to Ban, one for killing Genshuu Miyama, one for making Himiko Kudo cry, and one for all the kiriudo he sent to their deaths), and then proceeds to drive his head into the pavement with a ferocious "Snake Bite". 

Other members include: , sole survivor of the Hornet clan and specializes as the "Physician", : an assassin and leader of the mantis clan, : "musician" and the most powerful of the seven who fights by using his cicada warriors through the music he plays on his lute, : a "water wizard" who fights using seaweed,  : "Warrior" and Leader of the Beetle clan.

Protectors
 in GetBackers are people who are hired to protect their clients' possessions. They first encountered a protector named  in Act 2, Part 2 of the manga and episode six of the anime. A former professional wrestler, Hishiki earned the nickname "Undead" because of his ability to survive almost any attack thrown at him. After fighting him in the earlier arcs of the series, the GetBackers avoid fighting from then on.

Another group of protectors the GetBackers face are the Miroku 7, who are a family team of seven, skilled in the use of different weapons and different styles, although most of them use either swords or knives. They were first seen in the "Venus de Milo" arc, protecting the arms of the statue. When their father and an older brother and sister fight as a group, they are called The Three Knights (or Drei Ritter) and are bodyguards to der Kaiser. However, the anime only features Yukihiko and Natsuhiko.

What makes their strategy devastating is that they share a common vessel when needed, and any member can manifest in the vessel and engage the enemy. It is not uncommon during a fight for the siblings to take turns manifesting to fight their foes in different situations. It is later revealed that Natsuhiko was a childhood playmate of Ban, but after Ban had killed his sister , the Miroku 7 became Ban's sworn enemies. Ban killed Eris in self-defense; like the Kudo siblings, Eris was set upon Ban by the shamans. The GetBackers later find out that Eris was not Natsuhiko's blood sister but his betrothed 'bride' and the Miroku 7 are actually seven facets of a single person who will finally merge into one when Natsuhiko turns into an adult.

Transporters
A transporter's (運び屋 hakobiya) job in the GB universe is to ensure that an object or person makes it to its destination unhindered.

Kuroudo Akabane
, also known as "Dr. Jackal", works as a "Transporter" and has frequently been the Getbacker duo's enemy. He wears a 3-piece suit and an overcoat with a tie and a hat that usually covers most of his face, as he generally speaks with his head inclined. His weapons of choice are 108 razor-sharp surgical scalpels concealed inside his body, which come out and attack at his will. Akabane's other greatest asset is his incredible speed, which is matched by Ban's only: he can dispatch opponents with great ease, and this feat remains unchallenged even when his opponents are monsters from the Beltline.

Unlike the other transporters in GetBackers, Akabane seeks entertainment, rather than money. He chooses jobs exclusively for his own amusement and as to test his own ability; the limits of which he himself has never known. Kyoji Kagami refers to Akabane as "Babylon City's Kuroudo Akabane", so it is safe to assume he was, at one point, a resident of the upper towers. It is later revealed that he used to be a surgeon on the battlefield. When he failed to save Semimaru Kanade's son despite his best efforts, Akabane decided that his destiny is to kill people rather than to save them. According to Dr. Amano (Ginji's mother), this wish was the cause of Akabane's ascension to a Transcendental being with power nearly unparalleled in GB's world.

While the manga presents Akabane's sword and scalpels as being ordinary-looking physical weapons, the anime opts instead to illustrate them as glowing constructs that seem to be made of energy. His scalpels commonly glow white, but turn red when he uses his Bloody Rain, Cross, Hurricane, or Stream. His Bloody Sword is always red, manifesting in his hand as a sword of energy. Every time Akabane reappears in the manga, his hair and coat increase in length, and his hat brim grows outward.

Akabane's English voice actor, Shannon McCormick, has revealed in the commentary of episode 5 that the fight between Akabane and Ginji was jokingly referred to as the "Battle of the Shannons", since both voice actors have that name.

Himiko Kudou
 is a freelance transporter and first appears in act 3 part 2 (episode 3 in the anime) working against the GetBackers. She once worked with Ban Midou as a thief in the pre-GetBackers days, along with her older brother, Yamato. However, a misunderstanding took place upon witnessing the apparent murder of her sibling by Ban. Since then, she had a vendetta against him, vowing to kill him some day. In the manga, it is not clear in the series if Ban did explain himself to Himiko. Though they did work together during some missions while in the anime, it is explicitly said that "Ban made no excuse and offered no explanation for the incident." 

When Yamato was 28 years old, he was alone with Ban in their house so that they might face his "Voodoo Child mirror" (Himiko was sent out to buy a cake.) As a Voodoo Child, if one of two-halves dies, both perish. Ban realizes this too late when his "Snake Bite" killed Yamato's other half. When Himiko came back with the cake, she saw Ban's hand covered with Yamato's blood. Since that day, she has held a grudge against Ban. Occasionally an enemy, but more frequently an ally, Himiko has mixed feelings for Ban, whom she sees is a good person, but cannot reconcile this with her brother's killer. On Ban's part, he treats Himiko more like a little sister.

Known as "Lady Poison", Himiko, with her brother, Yamato, had developed around 200 poison concoctions, but they only carried seven with them at any one time. Some of the commonly used scents are:
Flame Perfume: causes fire to burn the inhaler from inside out. Sometimes Himiko inhales a little of the perfume herself, and by using controlled breathing techniques, is able to exhale fire like a flame thrower.
Retrogression/Devolution Perfume: turns the inhaler into a pre-historic, ape-like creature.
Time Limited Perfume: paralyzes the inhaler for a certain period of time, depending on the amount of poison used.
Puppet Perfume: a perfume emitted by Himiko's own body chemistry; it allows her to control the inhaler's movements against their will.
Trailing Perfume or Following Poison: when used, it leaves a trace scent on who, what, or wherever it's left on. This allows Himiko to track an object's movements or to find a certain location.
Sleep Perfume: one whiff and the inhaler falls asleep instantly. Himiko's favorite poison (along with Flame Perfume) to use on Ban when he angers her.
Acceleration Perfume: Himiko's most powerful and most dangerous perfume. It causes the inhaler's movements to become inhumanly faster, but three or more whiffs of the poison take a heavy toll on the user and is life-threatening.
Antidote Perfume: neutralizes the effects of Himiko's other perfumes.

It is revealed that these perfumes are 'catalysts' to evoke certain spells and magic related to the perfume. Ban once said, thinking that the perfumes are the true essence of the technique, that the Kudou siblings must carry many perfumes to their jobs, but Himiko retaliated, "How can perfumes only do anything in our 'magic shows'?" Yamato explained that a man can only perform seven different spells at a given time to avoid being overloaded, hence only seven vials of perfumes are brought for each mission. It was the first clue to Yamato and Himiko's past: Ban's grandmother and Maria Noches always warned him against 'catalysts', and how they were also used by 'our greatest enemy, the Shamans'.

In later chapters, it is revealed that she is Ban's sister by consanguinity through the Witch Queen. In the final chapter, she is shown with her trademark short hair, together with the other Transporters, as they set out for their next job, which is linked to Ban's mother.

VOLTS
The group led by Raitei (Ginji) who ruled Limitless Fortress after Takeru Teshimine disappeared. It consists of regular squads of fighters, led by the 4 Kings: Kazuki Fuuchouin, Masaki Kurusu, MakubeX and Shido Fuyuki. After Raitei was defeated by Ban, Ginji left the Infinity Fortress and VOLTS disbanded.

Wielders of the Divine Design
The  is the card game at the heart of Act VIII of the manga. These characters do not appear in the anime.

Lucifer
; Voiced by in drama CD: Unshou Ishizuka): Another of the Witch Queen's best disciples, "Lucifer" is the name he now goes under; one of his aims is to create a "paradise" using the powers of the Divine Design (and the clones of it which he had created). In this "paradise", he then hoped to see his daughter Angela again, who somehow was sacrificed to the Witches in a ritual. He's been working with the Brain Trust and after his defeat by the GB duo, the Professor hired Akabane to kill him.

By nature, he's not an evil person; Maria noted that if he had not worked with the Brain Trust, he could have succeeded the Witch Queen given his powers. His true name is Lukifer Pierre de' Medici.

Maria Noches
. One of the Witch Queen's (Ban Midou's grandmother) best disciples, Maria is an expert when it comes to magic and the occult. Outwardly, she resembles a busty lady in her late 20s, but it's actually just magic. She's really 99 years old. The Witch Queen entrusted a young Ban to her, and she took care of him for a few years. She likens Ban to the son she never had and although Ban was rude to her, he still has respect for his former guardian. She first offers her aid to the GB duo in the "Divine Design" arc. At times, she can act like a childish young lady, and as such, she's quite fond of Ginji Amano, who turns into his chibi form around her. As one of the most powerful member of the Witches' clan, she was feared and known by many. Her moniker, the Death Knell, demonstrated her power as the 'right arm' of the Witch Queen (possibly to counter Ban), nemesis for the Shamans.

Her voice actress is Michiko Neya on the drama CD.

Sariel
; Voiced by in drama CD: Atsushi Kisaichi: Sariel is one of the runaway children who decides to trust in the power of Lucifer and acts somewhat as a leader figure among the "Angels" of Lucifer. As Sariel, the most evil of the Archangels, he is supposedly immune to all illusions, including the Jagan. He is assigned to hinder Ban, but is defeated by the GetBackers, who uses his Jagan effectively during a brief moment when Sariel doubts himself and thinks as a child rather than a wielder of Divine Design. It is revealed that his real name is Kakeru Mikimoto and that his mother committed suicide by hanging herself in their apartment, and he is constantly haunted by the memory of the way her eyes looked at him when she died. He was later adopted by his uncle, whose family loved and welcomed him, and became Kakeru Doumoto (堂本 翔 Dōmoto Kakeru). While he was grateful and excelled in school, Kakeru continued to feel empty, especially when his adopted brother Osamu died in an accident and his grief-stricken aunt lamented as to why Osamu had to be the one who died. Lucifer contacts Kakeru during a high school application interview, where Kakeru says that he wants to enter that high school to become a doctor like his father. By questioning what Kakeru really wants, Lucifer is able to bring him into the world of Divine Design with ease. He eventually redeems himself by helping the GetBackers and returns to his family when he realizes his adopted mother had been lamenting why she herself, rather than Kakeru himself as he believed, had not died in the place of her son. After the events of Divine Design, he studies for college.

Gabriel
 Voiced by in drama CD: Yuko Sasamoto): First seen in Volume 1, "Gabriel" was an old customer of the GB duo. In the "Divine Design" arc, he hires the GetBackers to retrieve his missing cards, but reveals himself as a member of Lucifer's angels, and works against the GetBackers. When he fails to eliminate Himiko during Maria Noches' attempt to train the GetBackers and their allies to master Divine Design, Gabriel is assigned to hinder Ginji, but was also defeated by him. Gabriel reveals that his mother is a workaholic and does not seem to understand or care about him and he is always left home alone. Lucifer sought him out after Gabriel was bullied again and again at the prestigious private school his mother insisted, he continue attending, despite the fact he kept getting bullied and was clearly very unhappy. Realizing the power of Divine Design, Gabriel agreed to join Lucifer as the Archangel of Truth and becomes capable of manipulating water. Following his defeat and a subsequent chat of encouragement from Ginji, Gabriel demands that Ginji get back his Guardian Card by sunset, otherwise, as one who has betrayed Lucifer, he will die. He takes refuge in the Honky Tonk along with Rena ("Ramiel"). His real name, seen on a note from his mother, is Mamoru Saiki (佐伯 護 Saiki Mamoru). After the events of Divine Design, he has been getting along with his friends better and is good at video games.

(First Appearance — Manga: Act 1, Part 1)

Voodooists/Shamans and allies

Kyoji Kagami
 is known as "The Observer" and is resident of Babylon City (the topmost tower of the Limitless Fortress). Though Kagami Kyoji may seem to be harmless, beneath his polite manners and ready smile, he does not suffer fools gladly.

Kagami was first introduced when he came down to the lower town to "observe" the retrievers of "IL", first joining MakubeX's side and then later by going his own way. Kagami first appears inside MakubeX's monitor room, asking MakubeX if he thought that the Raitei of old was some kind of god. When Ginji Amano and Kuroudou Akabane of the IL retrievers prematurely arrived in the underground waste districts, both Kagami and Juubei go to encounter and greet them. With Juubei squaring off against Ginji, Kagami is paired off against Akabane.

Kagami is a master of mirrors, and his fighting style revolves around illusions and doubles by using diffuse reflections. His favorite choice of weapons are his mirror fragments, which are ground so finely that they resemble Diamond Dust which Kagami claims are made of demonic shards. When unleashed, these fragments can be inhaled by the opponent or absorbed through the skin if touched recklessly. Then, being diamond sharp, they damage the internal organs of the victim, even shredding them whenever possible. Another weapon in his arsenal is his speed. Very few characters have managed to match him in this department, except Ban, Akabane, and Himiko while under the effects of her Acceleration Scent.

Deeply calculating and cautious, Kagami's penchant for observing and planning also makes him a master strategist. It was later revealed that he is a member of the mysterious Brain Trust. His favorite activity is to observe the actions of his opponents, hence his title The Observer. In the power struggle among the denizens of Babylon City, he appears to defer to the Voodoo King, though the King suspects him of treachery. He's also known as  because of his skills with illusions.

Over time, Kagami becomes enamored by Himiko and how well she did when she fought him during the IL recovery arc and eventually comes into possession of her and awaits her seventeenth birthday when she will become a key he can use to re-enter Babylon City. He also intends to marry Himiko, claiming to love her. However, she does not love him back and is heartbroken when Kagami informs her that Ban is really her older brother.

In the "Get Back the Lost Time" arc, he was assigned to kill Hevn, as she tries to reach Babylon City. He was, however, stopped by her escort, Kuroudou Akabane. Later, after the two Himiko's merged, he fought with Ban and lost both the battle and his right arm. After making his escape, he was shocked to realize that the "Archive" had used him to achieve what it considered the best solution. His realization included the true meaning of the letters "G.B.", which are represented by the Greek letters for Gamma (γ) and Beta (β), respectively, indicating the "Archive" believes either Ginji (Gamma) or Ban (Beta) to be the best choice for the New King of Creation. Fearing that he may have already discovered too many secrets, the Specialist got Akabane to run through Kagami's heart with his Blood Sword. Before dying, Kagami reveals the Specialist's surname: Makube, the same as MakubeX's.

Kaoru Ujiie
(氏家薫 Ujiie Kaoru; Voiced by: Satsuki Yukino): A henchman of Masaki and Jouya's partner, Kaoru is a former member of VOLTS. Now, she serves Masaki and the Voodoo King under the moniker "Crimson (of the Cursed Knights) [深紅]". She's one of the few characters (along with Kanou and Sarai) who appeared first in the anime, then in the manga (though in the GB universe, their appearances are still roughly in the same "chronological" order). She uses flames as a primary form of attack, a skill which can be further enhanced by her partner. This partnership has existed since the time they were in VOLTS. In the anime version of her character, Kaoru was in love with Ginji and felt betrayed by him after he left Infinity Fortress. Near the end of the 2nd Infinity Fortress Arc, she wanted to be killed by the Thunder Emperor in their fight but Ginji convinces her to forget her obsession and remove the fire curse from Sakura's body.

Jouya Kanou
(叶条夜 Kanō Jōya; Voiced by: Kouki Miyata): Another of Masaki's henchmen, Jouya is Kaoru's partner and another former member of VOLTS. His skills are in the use of giant fans, which meant that, together with Kaoru, their powers are greatly increased. Also a member of the Cursed Knights, his moniker is now "Raven" (漆黒). Both Kaoru and Jouya are convinced that Masaki is doing the right thing, though they still have pangs of guilt when Shido questions them about their loyalties.

In the manga, he and Kaoru tried to stop the GB duo from bringing Hevn over to Masaki. Jouya, in particular, invoked his "Stigma" to increase his powers. However, he was completely outclassed by Ban from the beginning, who never doubted his own abilities.

Notes

References

GetBackers
GetBackers